ARDN originated in Alberta, created as a partnership of Alberta’s 21 public post secondary institutions.

History 

ARDN began operations in 2009 with a grant from the Rural Alberta Development Fund (RADF) and in-kind commitments from its post-secondary members.

Since its inception, ARDN has worked with several of Alberta's colleges, universities and organizations on projects, including Lakeland College and Portage College on a Regional Innovation Network in East Central Alberta, Mount Royal University on a Business Retention & Expansion Symposium, the Alberta Academy of Art and Design on the Company of Albertans, Pastor Tim Wray on the Young Adult Photovoice Project, and Lethbridge College on Social in the South.

More recently, ARDN administered the  Homelessness Partnering Strategy's Rural and Remote Homelessness funding stream for Alberta. So far, this has resulted in the funding of seven rural homelessness projects, including projects in Drayton Valley, Chestermere, Fort Macleod and Cochrane.

Members 
 Athabasca University
 Grande Prairie Regional College
 Keyano College
 Lethbridge College
 Medicine Hat College
 Northern Lakes College
 Portage College
 University of Calgary
 University of Lethbridge

Media 

ARDN publishes a newsletter.  The  RTAB is published at least once a month.

References 

Homelessness
Affordable housing
Rural community development
Non-profit organizations based in Alberta